Humber—St. George's—St. Barbe was a federal electoral district in Newfoundland and Labrador, Canada, that was represented in the House of Commons of Canada from 1968 to 1979.

This riding was created in 1966 from parts of Grand Falls—White Bay—Labrador and Humber—St. George's ridings.

It was abolished in 1976 when it was redistributed into Burin—St. George's and Humber—St. Barbe ridings.

It initially consisted of the provincial districts of Port au Port, Humber East, Humber West, St. Barbe South and St. Barbe North, and that part of the provincial district of St. George's not included in the electoral district of Burin-Burgeo.

Members of Parliament

This riding elected the following Members of Parliament:

Election results

See also 

 List of Canadian federal electoral districts
 Past Canadian electoral districts

External links 
 Riding history for Humber—St. George's—St. Barbe (1966–1976) from the Library of Parliament

Former federal electoral districts of Newfoundland and Labrador